Louise of Prussia may refer to:

Princess Louise Dorothea of Prussia (1680–1705), daughter of Frederick I of Prussia and wife of Frederick I of Sweden
Louisa Ulrika of Prussia (1720–1782), daughter of Frederick William I of Prussia and wife of Adolf Frederick of Sweden
Princess Louise of Prussia (1770–1836), daughter of Prince Augustus Ferdinand of Prussia and wife of Prince Anton Radziwill
Queen Louise of Prussia (1776–1810), daughter of Charles II, Grand Duke of Mecklenburg-Strelitz and wife of Frederick William III of Prussia
Princess Louise of Prussia (1808–1870), daughter of Frederick William III of Prussia and wife of Prince Frederick of the Netherlands
Princess Louise of Prussia (1829–1901), daughter of Prince Charles of Prussia and wife of Alexis, Landgrave of Hesse-Philippsthal-Barchfeld
Princess Louise of Prussia (1838–1923), daughter of William I of Prussia (later German Emperor) and wife of Frederick I, Grand Duke of Baden
Princess Louise Margaret of Prussia (1860–1917), daughter of Prince Frederick Charles of Prussia and wife of Prince Arthur, Duke of Connaught
Princess Victoria Louise of Prussia (1892–1980), daughter of William II, German Emperor and wife of Ernest Augustus, Duke of Brunswick